Sheep Island is a small uninhabited island situated off the southern tip of the Kintyre peninsula in Scotland.

There is a cave on the west coast and a natural arch at the northwest of the island. A considerable reef of drying rocks surrounds the island and makes landing on the island problematic. There are a number of strong tidal races in the area, Tum ba nach is one that extends north from Sheep Island to around halfway across the Sound of Sanda.

As the name suggests, sheep have traditionally been grazed here, however the island is more notable as the primary breeding ground for puffins in the Clyde.  From here the birds are returning to nearby Ailsa Craig, where they were once wiped out.  Guillemots and razorbills also nest on Sheep Island.

References 

Islands of the Clyde
Uninhabited islands of Argyll and Bute
Natural arches of Scotland